Beypore or Beypur (formerly Beypoor) is an ancient port town and a locality town in Kozhikode district in the state of Kerala, India. It is located opposite to Chaliyam, the estuary where the river Chaliyar empties into Arabian Sea. Beypore is part of Kozhikode Municipal Corporation. The place was formerly known as Vaypura / Vadaparappanad and also as Beydary. Tippu Sultan, ruler of Mysore, named the town "Sultan Pattanam". There is a marina and a beach while Beypore port is one of the oldest ports in Kerala, which historically traded with the Middle East. Beypore is noted for building wooden ships, known as dhows or urus in the Malayalam language. These ships were usually bought by Arab merchants for trading and fishing but are now used as tourist ships. According to Captain Iwata, founder member of the Association of Sumerian ships in Japan, Sumerian ships might have been built in Beypore. There is evidence to prove that Beypore had direct trade links with Mesopotamia and was a prominent link on the maritime silk route. The first railway line of Kerala was laid in 1861 from Tirur to Beypore (Chaliyam) passing through Tanur, Parappanangadi, Vallikkunnu, and Kadalundi.

History

The ancient trading port of Tyndis is often identified with Kadalundi-Chaliyam-Beypore region. Tyndis was a major center of trade, next only to Muziris, between the Cheras and the Roman Empire. Pliny the Elder (1st century CE) states that the port of Tyndis was located at the northwestern border of Keprobotos (Chera dynasty). The North Malabar region, which lies north of the port at Tyndis, was ruled by the kingdom of Ezhimala during Sangam period. According to the Periplus of the Erythraean Sea, a region known as Limyrike began at Naura and Tyndis. However the Ptolemy mentions only Tyndis as the Limyrike'''s starting point. The region probably ended at Kanyakumari; it thus roughly corresponds to the present-day Malabar Coast. The value of Rome's annual trade with the region was estimated at around 50,000,000 sesterces. Pliny the Elder mentioned that Limyrike was  prone by pirates. The Cosmas Indicopleustes mentioned that the Limyrike was a source of peppers.Das, Santosh Kumar (2006). The Economic History of Ancient India. Genesis Publishing Pvt Ltd. p. 301.

According to the Legend of Cheraman Perumals, the first Indian mosque was built in 624 AD at Kodungallur with the mandate of the last the ruler (the Cheraman Perumal) of Chera dynasty, who converted to Islam during the lifetime of Prophet Muhammad (c. 570–632). According to Qissat Shakarwati Farmad, the Masjids at Kodungallur, Kollam, Madayi, Barkur, Mangalore, Kasaragod, Kannur, Dharmadam, Panthalayini, and Chaliyam (just opposite to Beypore), were built during the era of Malik Dinar, and they are among the oldest Masjids in the Indian subcontinent.  It is believed that Malik Dinar died at Thalangara in Kasaragod town.

In medieval period, Beypore was ruled by four Kovilakams - Karippa Puthiyakovilakam, Manayat Kovilakam, Nediyaal Kovilakam and Panagad Kovilakam.
As the Gazetteers explain, the Beypore amsam itself had four Kovilakams called - Manayatt kovilakam, Nediyal
kovilakom, Puthiya kovilakom and the Panangat kovilakom belonging to the family of the Beypore
branch of the Parappanad family. Parappanad royal family is a cousin dynasty of the more famous Travancore royal family. Marthanda Varma, the founder of Travancore, belongs to Parappanad royal family. They also had branches at Parappanangadi, Vallikkunnu and Beypore. So we have North and South Parappanad factions to start with,
branching off the Parappur lordship. The North faction was further split into Beypore, Cheruvannor
and Panniyankara Kovilakoms. Considering that Ravi Varma and his brother mentioned Beypore
and the specific Manayyat location, let us for a moment assume Raja Ravi Varma hailed from the forerunners of the present Manayyat kovilakom.

Raja Raja Varma in his diary states - Near this
‘Beypore’ Kovilakam or house is a temple of Vettakaruman or the Hunter God which it is said and acknowledged by its present owners, the Manayam Rajahs, once belonged to us of the Tattari Kovilakam house, by which our family was known. Based on all the above, I would assume that the original Parappanad rajas named their home the Tattari Kovilakom. It is from this home, which
incidentally is further linked to the Kolathunad Rajas (Kolathiris) that various rulers (such as Marthanda Varma) and consorts as well as adoptees to the Travancore kingdom originated. Of course as we see, the ruling king usually reserved the right on the name raja and took affront to another cousin using the title while a raja was in power and complained, but then again, Ravi Varma in reality had some self-projection in mind, as we note. Now let us study the relations between the Parappanad Kovilakoms and the Travancore royal family to see where and how Ravi Varma fits in.

It is believed that the Beypore Siva Temple protects the whole kingdom. Beypore was visited first by Romans and afterwards by Chinese, Syrians, Arabs and in recent centuries by Europeans for trade. Beypore has long history of being a centre for shipbuilding since the first century AD, and it was further expanded under the East India Company during the early nineteenth century. The Indian Ocean trade started from ancient times and strengthened during the medieval times. While in the old days Malabar directly traded with the Greeks and Romans, it concentrated on exchanges with the Middle Eastern ports in the medieval times. This exchange of goods resulted also in transfer of people from their abodes. While it is mentioned that Malabari's were found along African ports and even Egypt's, it was mostly Arabs who migrated to the Malabar coasts, mainly to administer, control and conduct the trade with their brethren in Yemen, Basra and Egyptian ports. Beypore was virtually free port with only an export import duty imposed by the ruling Zamorins. The intermediaries between the Arabs and the Nairs were the Moplah's (themselves a community started by the intermingling Arab men and local women from ancient times). Also the south east Malay ports sent ships to Malabar for the cloth from Kerala, until British cloth took its place later in the 19th century. It was also a stop over for Hajj pilgrims from south east Asia. The Arab settlers in Malabar even had African slaves during that period.
The internationally well known Tasara Creative Weaving Centre which attracts textile artists and designers from all over the world is situated in North Beypore which is just one Km away from the Boat building yard.
Beypore was known as Beydhaalhee'' in neighboring Maldives. Maldivian national hero Muhammad Thakurufan learnt martial art and did his religious studies in Beypore.

Beypore Port

The land for the port was acquired from Beypore Karippa Puthiyakovilakam in 1963 and 1964. It is an estuarine port, where Beypore river discharges into the Arabian Sea. Beypore port is the second biggest port in Kerala after Cochin and currently handles about 100,000 tonnes of cargo and 7500 passengers per annum. The nearest ports are Kochi and Mangalore. Now the port has a depth of about  alongside wharf and approach channel and it is proposed to be developed in stages and utilities like storage shed, cranes and tugs are already installed. Beypore port is one of the oldest ports in Kerala from where trading was done to the Middle East.

Uru Building 

The Uru (boat), or "Fat Boat", is a generic name for large Dhow-type wooden ships made in Beypore. This type of boat has been used by the Arabs since ancient times as trading vessels, and even now, urus are being manufactured and exported to Arab nations from Beypore. These boats used to be built of several types of wood, the main one being teak. The teak was taken from Nilambur forests in earlier times, but now imported Malaysian teak is used.

Geography

Travel information
By road : Beypore is well connected by road and is just  from Kozhikode.

Demographics
 India census, Beypore had a population of 66,883. Males constitute 49% of the population and females 51%. Beypore has an average literacy rate of 81%, higher than the national average of 59.5%; with 50% of the males and 50% of females literate. 13% of the population is under 6 years of age.

Notable residents

 Vaikom Muhammad Basheer (21 January 1908 – 5 July 1994) was a humanist, freedom fighter, novelist and short story writer. He is fondly remembered as the Beypore Sultan.
 Mamukkoya, Malayalam film actor

Places of attraction
 Pulimuttu- Pulimuttu is the local name of the  bridge made of stone stretching in to sea. It is made by piling stones like a pathway to sea. 
 Beypore Beach
 Beypore light house is situated at the south bank of chaliyar.
Gotheeswaram Resort, Thambi road, Beypore
 Beypore Fishing Harbour, Beypore
Beypore Port 
Cheerp palam, B.C.Road
Beypore Silk (ship breaking Unit)
 Beypore Shiva Kshethram, Beypore
 Puthiyalath Paradevatha Kshethram
 Badrakali Temple Beypore
 Chambayil Chittekkat Bagavathy Temple, OM road, Beypore
 Ayyappa Temple, Arakkinar
 Kalkunnath Shiva temple
 Pinnanath Bagavathi Temple 
Karumakan temple
Gotheeswaram temple
 Sri Kuniyil Bagavathi Kshethram, B.C.Road, Beypore 
 Beypore Juma masjid
 Iqraa Masjid Beypore
St Andrew Church Beypore
Chaliyar lake

Notable Government Offices
Indian Coast Guard has established its only third station in Kerala at Beypore, namely Coast Guard Station Beypore. It was commissioned on 25 May 2006.

See also 

 Feroke
 Kadalundi
 Kadalundi Bird Sanctuary
 Karuvanthuruthy

 Chaliyar river
 Cheruvannur
Marad
Chaliyam
panniyankara

Image gallery

References

External links

 https://web.archive.org/web/20180203084635/http://visitbeypore.co.in/

Tourism in Kerala
Beaches of Kozhikode district
Kozhikode beach
Kozhikode south
Villages in Kozhikode district